The 1993–94 Dallas Stars season was the team's first season in Dallas. They finished third in the Central Division with a record of 42 wins, 29 losses, and 13 ties for 97 points. They swept the St. Louis Blues in the Conference Quarter-finals before losing the Conference Semi-finals in five games to the Vancouver Canucks.

Offseason

Draft picks
The Stars' picks at the 1993 NHL Entry Draft in Quebec City, Quebec.

Regular season

Season standings

Schedule and results

Player statistics

Regular season
Scoring

Goaltending

Playoffs
Scoring

Goaltending

Note: Pos = Position; GP = Games played; G = Goals; A = Assists; Pts = Points; +/- = plus/minus; PIM = Penalty minutes; PPG = Power-play goals; SHG = Short-handed goals; GWG = Game-winning goals
      MIN = Minutes played; W = Wins; L = Losses; T = Ties; GA = Goals-against; GAA = Goals-against average; SO = Shutouts; SA = Shots against; SV = Shots saved; SV% = Save percentage;

Playoffs
The Stars managed to qualify for the playoffs for the first time since 1992 when they were known as the Minnesota North Stars. They swept St. Louis in the first round 4-0, but lost in the second round to Vancouver 4-1.

Round 1 vs. St. Louis Blues (5)

St. Louis 3   Dallas 5

St. Louis 2    Dallas 4

Dallas 5 St. Louis 4 (OT)

Dallas 2  St. Louis 1

Dallas Wins Series 4-0

Round 2 vs. Vancouver Canucks (7)

Vancouver 6 Dallas 4

Vancouver 3 Dallas 0

Dallas 4 Vancouver 3

Dallas 1   Vancouver 2 (OT)

Dallas 2  Vancouver 4

Vancouver Wins Series 4-1.

Awards and honors

References
 Stars on Hockey Database

D
D
Dallas Stars seasons